Masubuchi Dam is a gravity dam located in Fukuoka Prefecture in Japan. The dam is used for flood control and water supply. The catchment area of the dam is 18.5 km2. The dam impounds about 74  ha of land when full and can store 13600 thousand cubic meters of water. The construction of the dam was started on 1968 and completed in 1973.

References

Dams in Fukuoka Prefecture
1973 establishments in Japan